Zin Min Htet is a Burmese military officer who is presently a Major General in the Myanmar Army. In May 2022, he was appointed as the chief of the Myanmar Police Force and deputy minister for Home Affairs, replacing Than Hlaing in both roles.

Military career 
Zin Min Htet graduated from the 32nd intake of the Defence Services Academy. He served as the military's Joint Adjutant General from 2019 to May 2022. 

In December 2022, he was sanctioned by Canada in response to the 2021 Myanmar coup d'état. On 20 February 2023, the European Union imposed sanctions on Zin Min Htet for human rights violations and undermining democracy and rule of law in the country.

Personal life 
Zin Min Htet is married to Thazin Khin, a urologist in Naypyidaw.

See also 

 2021–2023 Myanmar civil war
 State Administration Council
 Tatmadaw

References 

Living people
Burmese generals
Year of birth missing (living people)
Individuals related to Myanmar sanctions